Nathaniel Kramer (born 1961) is a film director, director of photography and cinematographer, as well as a fashion photographer, film producer, and documentary film director.

Biography
Kramer is the son of Terry Allen Kramer, a theatrical producer, and Irwin H. Kramer, an investment banker. His mother was a producer of the Broadway shows Shadowlands (1990) and Me and My Girl (1986). His father was  a managing director of investments at Allen & Company, a New York investment bank co-founded by his maternal grandfather, Charles Allen Jr. and his great-uncle, Herbert A. Allen, Sr. In 1998, he married Alexandra McGregor Morse in Palm Beach, Florida. In 2011 he married Merrie A. Harris. His sister, Toni Allen Kramer, married Italian American businessman and San Marinese Ambassador to the United Nations Daniele Bodini.

Work 
Kramer's photography has appeared in catalogs and advertisements for Gap, Reebok, Hanes, Ray Ban, J Crew, Talbots, Macy's, and Cover Girl. As well as in magazines such as GQ, Glamour, Lei, Vogue, Mademoiselle, Elle, Marie Claire, and New York, and has recently been shown in New York exhibitions.

Kramer won a Tony Award for Best Revival of a Play and a Drama Desk Award for Outstanding Revival of a Play for producing the 1998 revival of Arthur Miller's A View From the Bridge. In 1995, he produced the film Monster Mash, 1993's Emmy-nominated Choices, with Laurence Fishburne and Martin Sheen. In 2010, he produced, directed, and photographed the documentary film A LONG HAUL about a fisherman in Montauk, NY, which was an official selection at several film festivals.  In 2011, he directed the feature-length sequel Where Have All the Mermaids Gone?, which was nominated for best feature documentary at the Madrid International Film Festival and the Austin Film Festival. Also among his director of photography and film producer credits are Willa, a film based on a short story by Stephen King, and In the Shadow of the Water Tower, a film by the experimental filmmaker Lewis Smithingham. He has also been the director of photography on several music videos, including videos for Slaine, Goldie and the Casualties. In 2019, Nathaniel was to serve as producer and cinematographer with producer E.J. Meyers for the feature adaptation of the Stephen King story, The Ten O'Clock People, to be directed by Tom Holland.

References

Living people
American film directors
American film producers
Fashion photographers
1961 births
Allen family (investments)